Walter Schmidt may refer to:

Walter Schmidt (hammer thrower)
Walter Schmidt (baseball)
Walter Schmidt (footballer)
Walter Schmidt (minister), fourth Chief Apostle of the New Apostolic Church